The Kitzmeyer Furniture Factory, at 319 N. Carson St. in Carson City, Nevada, is a historic building built in 1873.  It is the oldest surviving Italianate-style commercial buildings in the commercial core area of Carson City.

It was built to provide a furniture showroom on the ground floor and furniture factory space above, and served in this way until 1901.
It was listed on the National Register of Historic Places in 1987.

References 

Italianate architecture in Nevada
Industrial buildings completed in 1873
National Register of Historic Places in Carson City, Nevada
Industrial buildings and structures on the National Register of Historic Places in Nevada
Defunct furniture manufacturers
Defunct manufacturing companies based in Nebraska
1873 establishments in Nevada